Slam Dance is a 1987 neo-noir thriller directed by Wayne Wang and starring Tom Hulce, Mary Elizabeth Mastrantonio, Virginia Madsen and Harry Dean Stanton. It was screened out of competition at the 1987 Cannes Film Festival.

Plot
A married cartoonist named C. C. Drood becomes involved in the cover up of a political sex scandal after his lover, Yolanda Caldwell, a call girl, is found murdered.

Drood has betrayed his wife Helen with the exotic Yolanda, whom he meets at a club where the patrons slam dance, violently crashing into one another on the dance floor.

Bobby Nye, a former lesbian lover of Yolanda's, hires a hit man named Buddy to do away with Drood, who is also hotly pursued by the police. Drood ultimately comes to believe that Bobby and Buddy are the ones responsible for Yolanda's death. A corrupt cop, Gilbert, is doing everything in his power to pin the whole thing on Drood, but a police colleague, Smiley, intervenes on the wanted man's behalf.

Buddy is eventually overcome with guilt in his role in the killing of Yolanda, so he spares Drood's life and takes his own. To escape with his wife and his life, Drood tries to make Nye and the cops believe that Buddy's body is actually his.

Cast
 Tom Hulce as C.C. Drood
 Mary Elizabeth Mastrantonio as Helen Drood
 Virginia Madsen as Yolanda Caldwell
 Harry Dean Stanton as Smiley
 Don Keith Opper as Buddy
 Adam Ant as Jim Campbell
 John Doe as John Gilbert
 Judith Barsi as Bean Drood
 Lisa Niemi as Miss Adrienne Schell
 Herta Ware as Mrs. Raines
 Millie Perkins as Bobby Nye
 Dennis Hayden as Mean Drunk

Production and reception
After writing and directing Chan Is Missing and Dim Sum: A Little Bit of Heart, the latter receiving "mixed reviews [and] modest [...] box office earnings", Wayne Wang chose to direct Slam Dance to avoid being seen as a director primarily of stories about Chinese Americans; as such, it was Wang's first film in which none of the main characters are Chinese. However, constant interference on the part of the producers led him to try and get his name taken off the film.

The film grossed $486,881 in the United States on a $4.5 million budget and received mixed reviews. Critics had some praise for the acting and cinematography, but faulted the plot as disjointed and confusing.  New York Times film critic Vincent Canby wrote in his November 6, 1987 review that Wang "goes straight if quite gracefully to the bottom with his first mainstream movie", describing it as "less interesting for its characters than for its fancy decor and images."

Release dates

 Canada - September 11, 1987 (Toronto Festival of Festivals)
 United States - October 2, 1987
 UK - November 13, 1987
 Italy - November 13, 1987
 Finland - November 27, 1987
 Norway - December 26, 1987
 Sweden - February 5, 1988

References

External links
 
 
 

1987 films
1980s crime films
1980s crime thriller films
1980s mystery films
American mystery films
American neo-noir films
British mystery films
British neo-noir films
Films about comics
Films about fictional painters
Films directed by Wayne Wang
Films set in Los Angeles
Films shot in Los Angeles
Punk films
1980s English-language films
1980s American films
1980s British films